The AFI Members' Choice Award, is a film award presented by the Australian Academy of Cinema and Television Arts (AACTA) to an Australian feature-length film that is voted for by members of the Australian Film Institute (AFI). Prior to the establishment of the Academy in 2011, the award was presented by the Australian Film Institute (AFI) at the annual Australian Film Institute Awards (more commonly known as the AFI Awards) from 2009–2010. The award is presented at the AACTA Awards Luncheon, a black tie event which celebrates achievements in film production, television, documentaries and short films.

Winners and nominees
In the following table, winners are listed first, in boldface and highlighted in gold; those listed below the winner that are not in boldface or highlighted are the nominees.

See also
AACTA Awards

References

External links
The Australian Academy of Cinema and Television Arts Official website

Awards established in 2009
F
Awards for best film